This is a list of the main association football rivalries in Germany.

Domestic club football

Inter-regional

Regional

Baden-Württemberg

Bavaria

Former East Germany

Hesse

Schleswig-Holstein

Lower Saxony / Bremen

North Rhine-Westphalia

Saarland

Local
Bavarian football derbies:
Munich derby: Bayern Munich vs. 1860 Munich
Unterhaching–Munich derby: SpVgg Unterhaching vs. Bayern Munich or 1860 Munich
Augsburg derby: TV 1847 Augsburg vs. BC Augsburg
Würzburg derby: Würzburger Kickers vs. Würzburger FV
Berliner derbies:
 East–West Berlin derby: Union Berlin vs. Hertha BSC
East Berlin  derby: Union Berlin vs. BFC Dynamo
Berliner political derby: Berliner AK 07 vs. BFC Dynamo
Bochum derby: VfL Bochum vs. SG Wattenscheid
 Brandenburg derby: Brandenburger SC vs. Stahl Brandenburg
 Cologne derby: 1. FC Köln vs. Fortuna Köln vs. Viktoria Köln
 Essen derby: Rot-Weiss Essen vs. Schwarz-Weiß Essen
 Frankfurt derby: Eintracht Frankfurt vs. FSV Frankfurt
 Hamburg derby: Hamburger SV vs. FC St. Pauli
 Herzogenaurach (Adidas–Puma) derby: ASV Herzogenaurach vs. 1. FC Herzogenaurach
 Leipzig derby: Chemie Leipzig vs. Lokomotive Leipzig
Oldenburg derby: VfB Oldenburg vs. VfL Oldenburg
 Stuttgart derby: VfB Stuttgart vs. Stuttgarter Kickers

European club football
Real Madrid versus Bayern Munich is the match that has historically been played most often in the Champions League/European Cup with 26 matches. Real's former biggest loss at home in the Champions League came at the hands of Bayern on 29 February 2000 (2–4). Due to Bayern being traditionally hard to beat for Madrid, Madrid supporters often refer to Bayern as the "Bestia negra" ("Black Beast"). Despite the number of duels, Bayern and Real have never met in the final of a Champions League or European Cup.

National team
The German national team also has many rivalries, including with England, Italy, the Netherlands, France, and Poland. When there were two German national teams, West and East Germany, they were also rivals.

England

The England–Germany football rivalry is considered to be mainly an English phenomenon—in the run-up to any competition match between the two teams, many UK newspapers will print articles detailing results of previous encounters, such as those in 1966, 1990 and 1996. Football fans in England often consider Germany to be their main sporting rivals and care more about this rivalry than those with other nations, such as Argentina or Scotland. Most German fans consider the Netherlands or Italy to be their traditional footballing rivals, and as such, usually the rivalry is not taken quite as seriously there as it is in England.

The English and German national football teams have played each other since the end of the 19th century, and officially since 1930. The teams met for the first time in November 1899, when England beat Germany in four straight matches. Notable matches between England and Germany (or West Germany) include the 1966 FIFA World Cup Final, and the semi-finals of the 1990 FIFA World Cup and UEFA Euro 1996.

France

The France–Germany football rivalry between the national football teams of Germany and IFrance, is one of the few longstanding football rivalries at a national level.

Italy

The Germany–Italy football rivalry between the national football teams of Germany and Italy, the two most successful football nations in Europe and only behind Brazil internationally, is a long-running one. Overall, the two teams have won eight FIFA World Cup championships (four each) and made a total of fourteen appearances in the final of the tournament (eight for Germany and six for Italy) – more than all the other European nations combined. They have played against each other five times in the World Cup, and many of these matches have been notable in the history of the tournament. "Game of the Century", the 1970 semifinal between the two countries that Italy won 4–3 in extra time, was so dramatic that it is commemorated by a plaque at the entrance of the Estadio Azteca in Mexico City.

Germany has also won three European Championships while Italy has won it twice. The two countries have faced each other four times in the European championship, with three draws (one German penalty shoot-out victory) and one Italian victory. While Germany has won more international championships, Italy is largely dominant in the head-to-head international match-up, having beaten Germany 15 times in 37 games, with 13 draws and 9 defeats. Moreover, Germany had never defeated Italy in a major tournament match until their victory in the Euro 2016 quarter finals, on penalties (though statistically considered a draw), with all Germany's other wins over Italy being in friendly competitions. However, the draw between the two teams in the group stage of Euro 1996 eliminated Italy from the tournament, while Germany had already qualified for the knockout stage.

Netherlands

The Germany–Netherlands football rivalry is one of the few longstanding football rivalries at a national level. Beginning in 1974 when the Dutch lost the 1974 FIFA World Cup to West Germany in the final (though deeply rooted in Dutch anti-German sentiment due to the German occupation of the Netherlands during World War II) the rivalry between the two nations has become one of the best known international football rivalries in the world.

Both football nations have been among the top ranked according to the strongest football nations by Elo Ratings, and have met a total of 45 times (of which 14 matches were competitive) which resulted in 16 victories for Germany, 17 draws, and 12 victories for the Netherlands.

East Germany vs. West Germany

The East Germany–West Germany football rivalry was an association football rivalry between teams from East Germany and West Germany, existing from 1949 to 1990, while two separate German countries existed.

Clubs from the two countries met at official level in both national team and club competitions like the FIFA World Cup or the European Cup. While the West German national team received strong support in East Germany, with supporters from the East often travelling to away matches of the West German team in Eastern Europe, encounters between teams from the East and West in European Cup competitions were often hard-fought.

See also
 Association football and politics
 Football hooliganism#Germany
 List of association football club rivalries in Europe

References

External links
 FootballDerbies.com
 FIFA.com
 EuroRivals.net – fixtures, results and videos of football derbies